Wilson Boit Kipketer (born 6 October 1973 in Kenya) is a middle and long distance athlete most widely known for running the 3000 m steeplechase.  On 13 August 1997, at the Weltklasse Zürich, he set the world record in the steeplechase at 7:59.08, the third of three world records set in a 70-minute period of time.  He was second individual after Moses Kiptanui to run under eight minutes.  Boit Kipketer's record only stood for 11 days before it was crushed by Bernard Barmasai who took almost  seconds off the mark.  A week earlier, Boit Kipketer led a Kenyan sweep of the same race in the 1997 World Championships, edging out Barmasai and then world record holder, three-time defending champion Kiptanui.  He came back two years later to claim a silver medal in the 1999 World Championships and the following year in the 2000 Olympics.

He was born into a large family, one of twelve children.

In 2003, during an immigration clampdown by the Swedish authorities, Boit Kipketer was refused permission to run in Stockholm where the event organisers had lined him up as one of the main attractions, because he did not have the required visa.

He planned to debut in marathon at the Düsseldorf Marathon on May 6, 2007.

He is not related to Wilson Kipketer, the 800 m runner who represented Denmark and was also part of the three world records set in 70 minutes in Zurich.  Both attended St. Patrick's High School at the same time.

Politics
After his competitive career, Kipketer went into local politics as a member of the county assembly of the Kabiemit Ward.

Major achievements
(3000 m steeplechase)
1997
1997 World Championships in Athletics - Athens, Greece.
gold medal
World Record - Zürich, Switzerland
7 minutes 59.08 seconds
1999
1999 World Championships in Athletics - Seville, Spain
silver medal
1999 All-Africa Games - Johannesburg, South Africa.
silver medal
2000
2000 Summer Olympics - Sydney, Australia.
silver medal
2002
2002 IAAF World Cup
gold medal
2002 African Championships - Tunis, Tunisia.
silver medal

References

External links

1973 births
Living people
Kenyan male middle-distance runners
Kenyan male steeplechase runners
Olympic athletes of Kenya
Olympic silver medalists for Kenya
Athletes (track and field) at the 2000 Summer Olympics
World Athletics Championships medalists
World Athletics Championships athletes for Kenya
Medalists at the 2000 Summer Olympics
Olympic silver medalists in athletics (track and field)
African Games silver medalists for Kenya
African Games medalists in athletics (track and field)
Athletes (track and field) at the 1999 All-Africa Games
World Athletics Championships winners